Achlyness (Scottish Gaelic:Achadh Linn an Eas) is a crofting hamlet on the shores of Loch Inchard, located near Rhiconich, Sutherland, Scotland, within the council area of Highland.

References

Populated places in Sutherland